Piast Faction (SP), informally Piast Party, formerly Polish People's Party "Piast" (PSL Piast); is a political party founded in 2006. Piast refers to the medieval  Piast dynasty, Poland's founding royal house. It was created after a 2006 split in the modern PSL party. Its major politicians include Zdzisław Podkański,  Janusz Wojciechowski and Zbigniew Kuźmiuk. It was an affiliate party of Libertas.eu.

The party is allied with Law and Justice.

Election results

Presidential

References

2006 establishments in Poland
Agrarian parties in Poland
Conservative parties in Poland
Libertas.eu
Piast
Political parties established in 2006
Right-wing parties in Europe